University of Seychelles, informally also called UniSey, is the primary institution of higher education in Seychelles. It was established on 17 September 2009.

There are three campuses: the main campus at Anse Royale, the Mont Fleuri campus offering education, communication, and technology programs, and the Ma Joie campus offering business programs.

In 2014, the university announced a partnership for collaboration and student exchanges with Gibraltar, which is developing its own first university.  The university also participates in the Commonwealth of Learning and the Pan-African e-Network project.

Chancellors
James Michel 2009 – 2021
Wavel Ramkalawan 2022 – present

Vice-Chancellors
Rolph Payet 2009–2012
Marina Confait 2012–2014
Dennis Hardy 2014–2017
Justin Valentin 2018–2020
Joëlle Perreau 2021–present

References

External links

 
Education in Seychelles
Educational organisations based in Seychelles
Educational institutions established in 2009
2009 establishments in Seychelles